Statistics of the Scottish Football League in season 1892–93.

Overview
Celtic became Scottish Football League champions for the first time.

Table

Results

References

 
1892-93
1892–93 domestic association football leagues
1